Greenfield Courthouse Square Historic District is a national historic district located at Greenfield, Hancock County, Indiana, United States. The district encompasses 72 contributing buildings and 1 contributing object in the central business district of Greenfield that developed between about 1835 and 1935. The focal point of the district is the Romanesque Revival style Hancock County Courthouse (1896–1897) and Second Empire style jail.  Other notable buildings are the Riley School (Greenfield High School, 1895), A.J. Banks Building / Morgan Building (1869), Randall Block (c. 1890), Christian Church (1895), Bradley Methodist Church (1902), First Presbyterian Church (1906–1907), Carnegie Library (1908–1909), Andrew Jackson Banks House (c. 1832, 1894–1895), D.H. Goble House (c. 1900), and Walpole House (c. 1835).

It was listed on the National Register of Historic Places in 1985.

References

County courthouses in Indiana
Historic districts on the National Register of Historic Places in Indiana
Courthouses on the National Register of Historic Places in Indiana
Romanesque Revival architecture in Indiana
Second Empire architecture in Indiana
Historic districts in Hancock County, Indiana
National Register of Historic Places in Hancock County, Indiana